The Technikon Witwatersrand was a technikon located in Johannesburg, South Africa.  On 1 January 2005, it merged with Rand Afrikaans University and the Soweto and East Rand campuses of Vista University to form the University of Johannesburg. The former Vista University East Rand Campus has subsequently been permanently closed.

Origins
Technikon Witwatersrand traces its roots back to the beginning of the 20th century to the Transvaal Technical Institute, which was established in 1903 to serve the needs of the gold-mining industry. For the greater part of its existence, it was housed in a temporary wood and corrugated iron structure, affectionately known as the Tin Temple, on the corner of Rissik and Plein streets in central Johannesburg. The Institute grew and developed, and in time gave rise to the Universities of the Witwatersrand and Pretoria. In 1923, an Act of Parliament made provision for technical training, which led to the establishment of the Witwatersrand Technical Institute in 1925. This was the founding date of the Technikon Witwatersrand. The Witwatersrand Technical Institute underwent a series of changes: it became the Witwatersrand Technical College in 1930, the Witwatersrand College for Advanced Technical Education in 1968 and finally, the Technikon Witwatersrand in 1979. Today, it is a large and complex institution. Some 12,000 students and 1,200 staff members from all spheres of the city's multifaceted community make up a vibrant educational centre extending across the east–west axis of Johannesburg.

The merger
On 31 May 2002, the Minister of Education, Kader Asmal, released the government's proposals for the restructuring of higher education in South Africa. Mergers between various educational institutions in South Africa were then proposed as necessary to the restructuring process.

Rand Afrikaans University and Technikon Witwatersrand were two of the institutions that were selected to merge with each other and are to become one comprehensive institution. Officially, the Technikon Witwatersrand and Rand Afrikaans University merged on 1 January 2005 to form a new institution by the name of the University of Johannesburg. The new institution offers both academic and technology degrees. The final meetings and preparations took place in 2004 so as to ensure that all structures were in place and that everything ran smoothly when the University of Johannesburg opened in 2005.

Schools in Johannesburg
Defunct universities and colleges in South Africa
Universities in Gauteng
Educational institutions established in 1903
Educational institutions disestablished in 2005
2005 disestablishments in South Africa
1903 establishments in Transvaal Colony